Bluff Great House is an Ancestral Puebloan great house and archeological site located in southeastern Utah, United States. It contained between fifty and sixty rooms, with four kivas and a great kiva nearby. Two ancient road segments were found in the area, and several berms were leveled to create a terrace, which is rare in Chacoan sites. The great house was partially excavated from 1996 to 2004, and archeologists believe the site was constructed, in at least two stages, between 1075 and 1150 CE by Chacoans who interacted with the Puebloan residents of both Mesa Verde and Kayenta, Arizona. Bluff Great House was abandoned .

References

Bibliography

 

Colorado Plateau
Ancestral Puebloans
Archaeological sites in Utah
Native American history of Utah